Owusu "Brobbey" Mensah (born 25 December 1934) is a Ghanaian sprinter. He competed in the men's 4 × 400 metres relay at the 1964 Summer Olympics.

References

1934 births
Living people
Athletes (track and field) at the 1964 Summer Olympics
Ghanaian male sprinters
Olympic athletes of Ghana
Place of birth missing (living people)